The 2020–21 Azerbaijan Cup is the 29th season of the annual cup competition in Azerbaijan, with Premier League side Gabala being the defending champions from the 2018–19 season after the 2019–20 completion was cancelled due to the COVID-19 pandemic in Azerbaijan.

Teams

Round and draw dates

First round

Quarterfinals

Semifinals

Final

Goal scorers

4 goals:
 César Meza  - Keşla

2 goals:

 James Adeniyi - Gabala
 Mahir Emreli  - Qarabağ
 Patrick Andrade  - Qarabağ
 Afran Ismayilov - Sabail
 Amil Yunanov - Sabail
 Roini Ismayilov - Zagatala
 Davit Volkovi - Zira
 Nemanja Andjelkovic - Zira

1 goals:

 Stefan Vukčević - Gabala
 Samir Qurbanov - Kapaz
 Ali Samadov  - Kapaz
 Shahriyar Aliyev  - Keşla
 Rahman Hajiyev  - Keşla
 Anatole Abang  - Keşla
 Sadio Tounkara  - Keşla
 Mijuško Bojović - Keşla
 Maksim Medvedev  - Qarabağ
 Owusu Kwabena  - Qarabağ
 Filip Ivanović - Sabah
 Adil Naghiyev - Sabail
 Ali Ghorbani - Sumgayit
 Rahim Sadikhov - Sumgayit
 Musa Gurbanli - Zira
 Ilkin Muradov - Zira
 Rodrigue Bongongui - Zira
 Clésio - Zira

Own goals:
 Shahriyar Aliyev (29 April 2021 vs Zira)
 Mijuško Bojović (24 May 2021 vs Sumgayit)

References

Azerbaijan Cup seasons
Azerbaijan
Cup